Robert Nelson MacCallum (November 5, 1888 – August 24, 1956) was a college football player and reverend.

Early years
MacCallum attended Mt. Vernon High School.

Sewanee
He was an All-Southern guard for the Sewanee Tigers of Sewanee:The University of the South, captain of the 1913 team. He graduated with a theology degree.

Reverend
MacCallum was a seminarian who served parishes in Tennessee, Georgia, Texas, New Mexico, and South Carolina. He was admitted as a candidate for Holy Orders on June 23, 1914 in Savannah, Georgia.

References

Sewanee Tigers football players
1888 births
1956 deaths
All-Southern college football players
American football guards
Players of American football from New York (state)